The UAE Presidential Guard (UAE-PG) is an elite military special operations unit of the United Arab Emirates Armed Forces. It is a military unit that operates outside the conventional framework of traditional armed forces. Its estimated 12,000 personnel are considered to be a premier fighting unit in the Middle East and the Arab world. 

It's seen as the Emirati version of the United States Secret Service as its duties include protecting the Ra'is albeit they are not limited by that role. The United States Marine Corps officially designates the UAE-PG as its Marine counterpart.

History
UAE-PG was formed in 2011 as a merger of the Amiri Guard, the Special Operations Command, and the Marine Battalion from the UAE Navy.

In a traditional tribal society, a paramount sheikh would be protected by his armed retainers. These retainers come from tribes which had demonstrated long-term loyalty to the ruler. With the formation of professional armed forces, these armed retainers became the Emiri Guard. In 2011, the Emiri Guard command of the UAE Armed Forces was integrated into the new Presidential Guard Command.  

Multiple foreign officers, including Major General Mike Hindmarsh from the Australian Army have served and/or are serving in the guard. In the case of Hindmarsh, he serves as the guard's commander. In October 2011, United States State Department approved of training support being provided by the United States Marine Corps for the guard under the Marine Corps Training Mission UAE (MCTM-UAE). At around the same time, the USMC officially designated the UAE-PG as its Marine counterpart. 

In January 2017, a 149-member contingent from the Presidential Guard, as well as 35-member band, marched in the presence of Sheikh Mohammed bin Zayed Al Nahyan and President Pranab Mukherjee on the Rajpath during the Delhi Republic Day parade of 2017.

In 2019, the UAE-PG has inaugurated the opening of Martyr's Park, dedicated to UAE-PG personnel who were killed in the line of duty.

Deployments

Afghanistan

The UAE-PG participated in the War in Afghanistan in support to the coalition efforts against the Taliban. Their role has mostly been active in the delivery of humanitarian aid as well as supporting the development of basic community infrastructure in Afghanistan.

2015 Yemeni Civil War

The Presidential Guard has played a role in the Yemeni Civil War in the support of the government of President Abdrabbuh Mansur Hadi.

Organization
The UAE PG has the UAE Special Operations Command under its control. It also has the Special Mission Unit.

Headquarters
The guard headquarters is located in Abu Dhabi, the capital of the United Arab Emirates. The building consists of a basement, a ground floor and three upper levels. It has a length of about 31,000 square meters.

Training
Training of UAE-PG personnel is provided under the USMC's UAE Marine Corps Training Mission - United Arab Emirates (UAE MCTM - UAE) unit.

See also
Republican Guard (Syria)
Republican Guard (Algeria)
Republican Guard (Egypt)
Republican Guard (Lebanon)

Further reading 

 The Evolution of the Armed Forces of the United Arab Emirates by Athol Yates

Sources

Guards of honour
Military of the United Arab Emirates
Military units and formations established in 2011